Achaeus japonicus, sometimes known as the orang-utan crab, is a crab of the family Inachidae (spider crabs or decorator crabs) which can be observed in tropical waters of the central Indo-Pacific.

It is frequently, but not always, found in association with the bubble coral Plerogyra sinuosa.

Humann and DeLoach classify the orang-utan crab as "Oncinopus sp. 1" and assert it was "formerly classified" as Achaeus japonicus, though they describe their own genus identification as "tentative."

References

External links 

 http://www.marinespecies.org/aphia.php?p=taxdetails&id=441846
 

Majoidea
Crustaceans described in 1839